Alesya Aleshina (born 2003 in Nizhny Novgorod) is a Russian professional squash player. She reached a career-high ranking of World No. 196 in February 2020. She won the 2021 Women's PSA Squash Tour.

References 

Russian squash players
Living people
Year of birth missing (living people)
Sportspeople from Nizhny Novgorod